Carmen Martinez may refer to:

Carmen Martínez (athlete), Paraguayan distance runner
Carmen Martínez Aguayo, Spanish politician
Carmen Martínez Castro (born 1961), Venezuelan-Spanish journalist
Carmen Martínez Ramírez, Spanish politician 
Carmen Martínez Sancho (1901–1995), Spanish educator
Carmen Martínez Sierra, Spanish actress
Carmen Martínez Ten, Spanish physician
Carmen Elena Rendiles Martínez (1903–1977), Venezuelan nun
Carmen Gil Martinez (born 1962), Spanish children's writer
Carmen Maria Martinez, American diplomat